Coal Run is a  long 2nd order tributary to Chartiers Creek in Allegheny and Washington Counties, Pennsylvania.

Course
Coal Run rises about 0.25 miles southeast of Cecil, Pennsylvania and then flows northeast to join Chartiers Creek across from Bridgeville.

Watershed
Coal Run drains  of area, receives about 38.8 in/year of precipitation, has a wetness index of 326.44, and is about 43% forested.

See also
 List of rivers of Pennsylvania

References

Rivers of Pennsylvania
Rivers of Allegheny County, Pennsylvania
Rivers of Washington County, Pennsylvania